Salvage Dawgs is an American reality television series detailing the experiences of Mike Whiteside and Robert Kulp, co-owners of the architectural salvage store Black Dog Salvage, as they negotiate for bids on vintage architectural elements inside buildings that are planned to be demolished. First airing on November 8, 2012 to mild audience reception, the show ran for 11 seasons on the DIY Network and ended in January 2020, citing problems related to the COVID-19 pandemic.

Background
The show is centered around employees of Black Dog Salvage - a salvage company based out of Virginia, US - finding, acquiring, and eventually selling valuable (yet abandoned or soon-to-be destroyed) pieces of construction salvage. According to the two owners (Robert Kulp and Mike Whiteside) Black Dog Salvage was established when the pair found themselves in possession of a large vinyl sign, managing to sell it soon after coming across it. This sale led to the evolution from simple garage sales to the purchase of a company warehouse, where they now operate.

Production
In 2020, the series ceased production due to the coronavirus outbreak, in addition to reports of changes at DIY Network.

See also
 Woodcraft Supply

References

2010s American reality television series
2012 American television series debuts
2020 American television series endings